North West England was a constituency of the European Parliament. From the 2009 elections it elected 8 MEPs using the D'Hondt method of party-list proportional representation, until the UK exit from the European Union on 31 January 2020.

Boundaries
The constituency corresponded to the North West England region of the United Kingdom, comprising the counties of Cheshire, Cumbria, Greater Manchester, Lancashire and Merseyside.

History

Following the passing of the European Parliamentary Elections Act 1999, the North West of England formed one constituency from which candidates are elected using the D'Hondt method. In the election preceding that Act, MEPs were elected by the first-past-the-post method in single-member constituencies. The constituency corresponded to the following former European constituencies: Cheshire East, Cheshire West and Wirral, Cumbria and Lancashire North, Greater Manchester Central, Greater Manchester East, Greater Manchester West, Lancashire Central, Lancashire South, Merseyside East and Wigan, Merseyside West, and Congleton from Staffordshire West and Congleton.

Returned members

Election results

Elected candidates are listed in bold.  Brackets indicate the order candidates were elected and the number of votes per seat won in their respective columns.

2019

2014

2009

2004

1999

External links
 European Election 2009 – Results Breakdown for the North West (by district)
 Includes photos, contact information, links to EU website profiles

References

European Parliament constituencies in England (1999–2020)
Politics of North West England
1999 establishments in England
Constituencies established in 1999
Constituencies disestablished in 2020